Bangsal is a Thana of Dhaka District in the Division of Dhaka, Bangladesh. It was formed in September 2009 from part of Kotwali Thana.

Points of interest
 Koshaituli Mosque, built in 1919, blends pre-Mughal and Mughal architectural styles. Rectangular in plan, it has three fluted onion domes, the middle one larger than those on either side, and multifoiled or cusped arches. Decorated in 1971, it is one of the most ornate in Old Dhaka. Its entire surface is covered with mosaics made from broken bits of ceramic and glass that form geometric and floral designs and calligraphic inscriptions.

See also
Upazilas of Bangladesh
Districts of Bangladesh
Divisions of Bangladesh

References

Old Dhaka
Thanas of Dhaka